Patronage is the support, encouragement, privilege, or financial aid that an organization or individual bestows to another.

Patronage may also refer to:
Patronage (transportation) or ridership, a statistical quantity of passengers 
Patronage (novel), an 1814 novel by Maria Edgeworth
Spoils system or patronage system
Ius patronatus or right of patronage in Roman Catholic canon law
Patronage Rules or Benefices Rules, rules governing the appointment of patrons in the parish system in England
 Disputes over Patronage (lay) in the Church of Scotland led to it splitting on several occasions.

See also
Patron god
Patron saint